Suphanat Mueanta (born 2 August 2002) is a Thai professional footballer who plays as a forward for Buriram United and the Thailand national team, he is the younger brother of Supachok Sarachat.

International career
In October 2018, he played the 2018 AFC U-19 Championship with Thailand U19.

On 24 March 2019 Suphanat made 1 goal, helping Thailand U23 to beat Brunei 8–0 the second match, Group K in 2020 AFC U-23 Championship qualification.

Suphanat was named in head coach Sirisak Yodyardthai squad for Thailand in the 2019 King's Cup in June 2019.

In January 2020, Suphanat become the youngest-ever to score in a game at the AFC U-23 Championship with Thailand U23, this tournament acts as the AFC qualifiers for the 2020 Summer Olympics men's football tournament.  He scored against Bahrain U23 on the first matchday.

Personal life
Suphanat has an older brother, Supachok Sarachat, who is also a footballer and plays as an attacking midfielder for Consadole Sapporo, on loan from Buriram United.
His younger brother, Chotika Mueanta,  plays football for Buriram United Academy. 
While Suphanat and Chotika use paternal surname, Supachok uses maternal surname.

Career statistics

Club

International

International goals
Scores and results list Thailand's goal tally first.

Honours

Club
Buriram United
 Thai League 1: 2018, 2021–22
 Thai FA Cup: 2021–22
 Thai League Cup: 2021–22
 Thailand Champions Cup: 2019

International
Thailand U-16
 AFF U-16 Youth Championship: Runners-up 2017

Individual
 AFF Youth Player of the Year: 2019
 2020 AFC U-19 Championship qualification: Top scorer
 Thai League 1 Player of the Month: February 2023 
 Thai League 1 Goal of the Month: February 2023

References

External links

2002 births
Living people
Suphanat Mueanta
Suphanat Mueanta
Suphanat Mueanta
Association football forwards
Suphanat Mueanta
Suphanat Mueanta
Competitors at the 2019 Southeast Asian Games
Suphanat Mueanta
Suphanat Mueanta